1426 Riviera, provisional designation , is a bright asteroid from the central regions of the asteroid belt, approximately 16 kilometers in diameter. Discovered by Marguerite Laugier at the Nice Observatory in 1937, the asteroid was later named for the Côte d'Azur, also known as French Riviera.

Discovery 

Riviera was discovered on 1 April 1937, by French astronomer Marguerite Laugier at the Nice Observatory in southeastern France. Two nights later, the asteroid was independently discovered by South African astronomer Cyril Jackson at the Union Observatory in Johannesburg on 3 April 1937. The Minor Planet Center only recognizes the first discoverer.

Orbit and classification 

Riviera is a non-family asteroid of the main belt's background population. It orbits the Sun in the central asteroid belt at a distance of 2.2–3.0 AU once every 4 years and 2 months (1,515 days). Its orbit has an eccentricity of 0.16 and an inclination of 9° with respect to the ecliptic. The body's observation arc begins at Johannesburg Observatory in 1937, two weeks after its official discovery observation at Nice.

Physical characteristics 

Riviera is an assumed stony S-type asteroid.

Rotation period 

In March 2003, a rotational lightcurve of Riviera was obtained from photometric observations by French amateur astronomers Laurent Bernasconi and Nathanaël Berger. Lightcurve analysis gave a well-defined rotation period of 4.4044 hours with a brightness amplitude of 0.30 magnitude. Other lightcurves with a concurring period between 4.38 and 4.40 hours were obtained by René Roy, Horacio Correia and by a group of astronomers at the Pico dos Dias Observatory in Brazil.

Diameter and albedo 

According to the surveys carried out by the Infrared Astronomical Satellite IRAS, the Japanese Akari satellite and the NEOWISE mission of NASA's Wide-field Infrared Survey Explorer, Riviera measures between 14.29 and 18.033 kilometers in diameter and its surface has an albedo between 0.2671 and 0.414.

The Collaborative Asteroid Lightcurve Link derives an albedo of 0.3274 and a diameter of 15.35 kilometers based on an absolute magnitude of 10.9.

Naming 

This minor planet was named after the French Riviera (Côte d'Azur), the Mediterranean coast in southeastern France, noted for its mild weather and where the discovering Nice Observatory is located. The asteroid's name was suggested by Frederick Pilcher, after whom  was named. The official naming citation was published by the Minor Planet Center on 8 April 1982.

References

External links 
 Asteroid Lightcurve Database (LCDB), query form (info )
 Dictionary of Minor Planet Names, Google books
 Asteroids and comets rotation curves, CdR – Observatoire de Genève, Raoul Behrend
 Discovery Circumstances: Numbered Minor Planets (1)-(5000) – Minor Planet Center
 
 

001426
Discoveries by Marguerite Laugier
Named minor planets
19370401